Xiongguan District is one of the three districts comprising the city of Jiayuguan, Gansu province, China. It was established on December 1, 2009.

See also
 List of administrative divisions of Gansu

References

County-level divisions of Gansu
Jiayuguan City
2009 establishments in China